Benson is a common patronymic surname of English origin meaning "son of Ben" (Benedict, Benjamin, Bennett). Benson is uncommon as a first name, but quite common as a surname in English speaking countries.

Notable people with the name Benson include:

A. C. Benson (1862–1925), English poet and essayist
A. V. Benson (1869–1939), South Australian medical doctor and sports enthusiast
Ada Benson (1840–1882), British headmistress and educationist
Adolph B. Benson (1881–1961), Swedish-American educator and historian
Al Benson (1908–1978), American radio DJ, music promoter and record label owner
Al Benson (basketball), American professional basketball player
Alexander Benson (1872–1947), American diplomat
Alfred W. Benson (1843–1916), United States Senator from Kansas
Allan L. Benson (1871–1940), American journalist and Socialist Presidential candidate
Allen Benson (1908–1999), American professional baseball player
Amber Benson (born 1977), American actress
Ambrosius Benson (c. 1495/1500 – 1550), Italian painter, part of the Northern Renaissance
Andrew Benson (1917–2015), American chemist
Anna Benson (born 1976), American model
Annette Benson (1895–1965), British film actress
Sir Arthur Benson (1907–1987), British colonial administrator and governor
Arthur W. Benson (–1889), American industrialist and real-estate developer
Ashley Benson (born 1989), American actress
Aslag Benson (1855–1937), member of the North Dakota Senate from 1903 to 1906
Barry W. Benson (–1839), secretary of state of Mississippi
Benny Benson (1913–1972), creator of Alaska's state flag
Bernadette Benson, Canadian born athlete specialising in ultra distance events
Bernard Benson (1922–1996), British inventor, author of The Peace Book
Bertil W. Benson (1843–1907), Norwegian-born American politician in North Dakota
Bill Benson (rugby league) (1893–1968), Australian rugby league player
Bob Benson (1883–1916), English professional footballer
Bobby Benson (1922–1983), entertainer and musician who influenced the Nigerian music scene
Brad Benson (born 1955), American football player
Brendan Benson (born 1970), American musician
Bruce Benson (disambiguation)
Bryan Benson, Governor of the Bank of England from 1735 to 1737
Carl Benson, pseudonym of American writer Charles Astor Bristed (1820–1874)
Carla L. Benson, American vocalist, most known for her recorded background vocals
Carville Benson (1872–1929), American politician
Catherine Benson (born 1992), American rugby union player
Catherine Brewer Benson (1822–1908), one of the earliest women to earn a college bachelor's degree in the U.S.
Cedric Benson (1982–2019), American football player for the Green Bay Packers
Charles Benson (American football) (born 1960), American former professional football defensive end
Chima Simone Benson (born 1982), TV personality and freelance journalist
Christopher Benson (1788–1868), Cambridge educated theologian
Sir Christopher Benson (born 1933), British business man 
Claus Benson (born 1889), American basketball player
Cliff Benson (born 1961), former American football tight end
Connie Benson (1889–1969), Canadian professional ice hockey player
Constance Benson (1864–1946), British stage and film actress
Constantine Walter Benson (1909–1982), British ornithologist
Craig Benson (born 1954), American businessman and politician
Craig Benson (swimmer) (born 1994), Scottish double Olympian (London 2012 and Rio 2016) 
David Benson-Pope (born 1950), New Zealand politician
Dee Benson (born 1948), American judge
Doug Benson (born 1964), American comedian and actor
Duane Benson (1945–2019), American football player and politician
E. F. Benson (Edward Frederic Benson, 1867–1940), English novelist
Edgar Benson (born 1923), Canadian politician
Edward Benson (bishop) (Edward White Benson, 1829–1896), Archbishop of Canterbury
Edwin Benson (1931–2016), American educator
Egbert Benson (1746–1833), American politician and jurist
Elizabeth English Benson (1904–1972), American educator
Elmer Austin Benson (1895–1985), American politician
Eva Benson (1875–1949), Australian artist
Ezra Taft Benson (1899–1994), American politician and the 13th President of The Church of Jesus Christ of Latter-day Saints
Frank Benson (disambiguation)
Fred Benson (born 1994), Dutch-Ghanaian footballer 
Gayle Benson (born 1947), American businesswoman and sports team owner
George Benson (disambiguation)
Gordon Benson (born 1994), British triathlete
Herbert Benson (1935-2022), American physician
Henry N. Benson (1872–1960), American politician
Herbert Benson (born 1935), American cardiologist and Harvard professor, author of The Relaxation Response
Howard Benson (born 1956), music producer
Ivy Benson (1913–1993), British bandleader
James Benson (disambiguation)
Jane Benson, contemporary English artist
Jessica Benson (born 1988), American singer
Jo Jo Benson (1938–2014), stage name of Joseph M. Hewell, American R&B and soul singer
Joan Benson (1925–2020), American keyboard player
Joanne Benson (born 1943), American politician
Jocelyn Benson (born 1977), American academic and politician
Jodi Benson (born 1961), American voice actress and singer
John Benson (disambiguation)
Karl Benson (born 1951), American college sports administrator
Kent Benson (born 1954), American basketball player
Kris Benson (born 1974), American baseball player
Lee Benson, American sports writer
Margaret Benson (1865–1916), English author and amateur Egyptologist
Margaret Jane Benson (1859–1936), British botanist and scholar
Mark Benson (engineer), German-born inventor of the Benson boiler
Mark Benson (born 1958), English cricketer
Martin Benson (actor) (1918–2010), British actor
Mary Benson (hostess) (1841–1918), English hostess
Mary Benson (campaigner) (1919–2000), South African writer and anti-apartheid activist
Michael Benson (disambiguation)
Mildred Benson (1905–2002), American  writer
Mykel Benson (born 1987), American football player
Nicholas John Benson (born 1961), Ghanaian-American soldier, lawyer, businessman, writer
Nicholas Benson (born 1964), American stone carver
Nigel Benson (born 1955), British author and illustrator
Ole E. Benson (1866–1952), American politician
Perry Benson (born 1961), English actor
Ray Benson (born 1951), American actor and composer
Raymond Benson (born 1955), American author
Renaldo Benson ("Obie" Benson, 1936–2005), American soul and R&B singer and songwriter
Rex Benson (merchant banker) (1889–1968)
Rhian Benson (born 1977), Ghanaian singer
Richard Benson (singer) (born 1955), English-Italian guitarist
Richard Meux Benson (1824–1915), Anglican clergyman and founder of an Anglican religious order
Rita Romilly Benson (1900 – 1980), American actress and acting teacher

Robert Benson (disambiguation)
Ron Benson (1925–1997), English professional footballer
Sally Benson (1897–1972), American screenwriter
Sally Benson (professor), professor of energy engineering at Stanford University
Sam Benson, CBE (1909–1995), Australian politician
Samuel P. Benson (1804–1876), United States Representative from Maine
Seve Benson (born 1986), English professional golfer
Shaun Benson (born 1976), Canadian actor
Shebin Benson (born 1995), Indian film actor from the Malayalam film industry
Sheila Benson, American journalist and film critic
Sheri Benson, Canadian politician
Simon Benson (1851–1942), Norwegian-born American logging entrepreneur and philanthropist
Stella Benson (1892–1933), English feminist, novelist, poet, and travel writer
Stephanie Benson (Princess Akua Ohenewaa Asieanem of Kokobin), UK based Ghanaian singer and performer
Stephen Allen Benson (1816–1865), President of Liberia 1856–1864
Steve Benson (disambiguation)
Susan Porter Benson (1943–2005), American historian
T. D. Benson (1857–1926), British socialist activist
T. O. S. Benson (1917–2008), Nigerian lawyer
Taylor Benson (1922–1996), member of the Wisconsin State Senate
Teco Benson, Nigerian film director and producer
Tom Benson (disambiguation)
Tony Benson (athlete) (born 1942), Australian long-distance runner 
Tony Benson (rugby league) (born 1965), New Zealand rugby league coach
Trent Benson (born 1971), South Korean-born American murderer
Trinity Benson (born 1997), American football player
Troy Benson (born 1963), former professional American football player
Trudy Benson (born 1985), American artist
Vern Benson (1924–2014), American baseball player
Violet Benson, (online alias Daddy Issues), Russian-born American Internet personality
Warren Benson (1924–2005), American composer and timpanist
Wayne Benson, American mandolinist and songwriter in the bluegrass tradition
Wendy Benson (born 1971), American actress seen in many television shows
Will Benson (born 1998), American baseball player
William Benson (disambiguation)

Fiction
Carly Corinthos (née Benson), role played by Sarah Joy Brown and Laura Wright in American soap opera General Hospital
Freddie Benson, role played by Nathan Kress in American TV sitcom iCarly
Kurt Benson, character in British soap opera Hollyoaks
Olivia Benson, character in American police drama Law & Order: Special Victims Unit
Benson, brother-in-law of Deputy Arthel Queen in the novel Deliverance
Jamesir Bensonmum, character played by Sir Alec Guinness in the 1976 comedy film Murder by Death
Zoe Benson, character played by Taissa Farmiga in American Horror Story: Coven
Barry B. Benson, Bee protagonist played by Jerry Seinfeld in Bee Movie
Benson Dunwoody, a main character in the animated television series Regular Show.  He's Mordecai and Rigby's boss.

See also
Benton (surname)
Bernson, surname
Benson family tree showing the relationship between some of the above
Bason
Beson

References

Surnames of English origin
Patronymic surnames
English-language surnames
Surnames of British Isles origin
Surnames from given names